The Aero-Service Panda is a Polish ultralight, designed and produced by Aero-Service Jacek Skopiński of Warsaw. The aircraft is supplied complete and ready-to-fly.

Design and development
The Panda was designed to comply with the Fédération Aéronautique Internationale microlight rules. It features a cantilever high-wing, a T-tail, a two-seats-in-side-by-side configuration enclosed cabin, fixed tricycle landing gear and a single engine in tractor configuration.

The aircraft is made from sheet aluminum, with some parts, such as the engine cowling and wing tips  made from composites.

The Panda prototype was first flown on 28 September 2011.

Operational history
Reviewer Marino Boric described the design in a 2015 review as possessing visibility that "is good in all directions because of very large glassed surfaces". He also noted that it is "sold at a reasonable price".

Variants
Panda Standard
Base model powered by an  Rotax 912UL four-stroke powerplant.
Panda Sport
Model powered by a  Rotax 912ULS four-stroke powerplant.
Panda Exclusive
Model powered by a  Rotax 912ULS four-stroke powerplant plus with a Dynon glass cockpit and other options as standard.

Specifications (Panda Standard)

See also
Aero-Service Puma

References

External links

Panda
2010s Polish ultralight aircraft
Single-engined tractor aircraft